Bituing Marikit is the first full-length film produced by Sampaguita Pictures, released in 1937. It starred Elsa Oria and Rogelio de la Rosa.

Cast
Rogelio de la Rosa	
Juancho Gutierrez		
Daisy Romualdez		
Elsa Oria
Sylvia La Torre

References

External links

1937 films
1938 films
1937 comedy films
1938 comedy films
Tagalog-language films
Sampaguita Pictures films
Philippine comedy films